Cliff Craft is an album by American jazz saxophonist Clifford Jordan featuring performances recorded in 1957 and released on the Blue Note label.

Reception
The Allmusic review by Lee Bloom awarded the album 4 stars calling it a "wonderfully relaxed recording, which dates from a very fertile period of the renowned jazz label's history".

Track listing
All compositions by Cliff Jordan except as indicated
 "Laconia" - 7:06
 "Soul-Lo Blues" - 8:29
 "Cliff Craft" - 6:30
 "Confirmation" (Charlie Parker) - 7:34
 "Sophisticated Lady" (Duke Ellington, Irving Mills, Mitchell Parish) - 6:46
 "Anthropology" (Dizzy Gillespie, Parker) - 7:03
Recorded at Rudy Van Gelder Studio in Hackensack, New Jersey on November 10, 1957

Personnel
Clifford Jordan - tenor saxophone
Art Farmer - trumpet (tracks 1-4 & 6)
Sonny Clark - piano
George Tucker - bass
Louis Hayes – drums

References

Blue Note Records albums
Clifford Jordan albums
1957 albums
Albums produced by Alfred Lion
Albums recorded at Van Gelder Studio